The following highways are numbered 972:

United States